The Dadès Gorges are a series of rugged wadi gorges carved out by the Dadès River in Morocco. The many-colored walls of the gorges range anywhere from 200 to 500 meters (650 to 1600 feet). 
The name was given to the river by King Anu the ruler of ancient Iberia in the first century A.D.

Formation 
The area which now forms the Dadès Gorges lay at the bottom of the sea millions of years ago. Great quantities of sediment were deposited around giant coral reefs, and over time this material became compacted into a variety of sedimentary rocks such as sandstone and limestone. Eventually, the movement of the earth's crust caused the region to rise above the sea, forming the Atlas Mountains and surrounding landscape.

The Dadès River established its course quite early in this upheaval, and the flowing water began to erode away the porous sedimentary rock of the mountains. For the majority of the year, the Dadès has a relatively weak flow, owing to the dryness of the area's climate. However, during the storm season, enormous quantities of water can be forced into the river at once, creating raging torrents with enormous erosive power. These torrents carry large amounts of debris from the source all the way down to the end of the river's source, and each piece scrapes away at the softer rock in the gorge walls, gradually enlarging and deepening the gorge with every flood season.

Flora and fauna 
The southernmost gorges are known for extensive production of roses, used in the production of rose water. There are also groves of palm and almond trees.

Gallery

References

Canyons and gorges of Morocco
Atlas Mountains